"It's for You" is a song recorded by Cilla Black in 1964 and written by Paul McCartney and John Lennon.

It's for You may also refer to:
"It's for You" (Shanice song) (1993)
"It's for You" (Niamh Kavanagh song) (2010)
It's for You (U-ka Saegusa in dB song), 2002
"It's for You", a song by Player (1980)
"It's For You", an instrumental by Pat Metheny and Lyle Mays on the album As Falls Wichita, So Falls Wichita Falls (1981)
"It's for You", a song by Three Dog Night from the self-titled album (1968)

See also
It's for You, North Dakota U